is the traditional name of the month of March in the Japanese calendar. It can also refer to:
Yayoi (given name), a Japanese female given name
Yayoi Kusama, a Japanese artist and writer
Yayoi people, an ancient ethnic group
Yayoi period, a pre-historical era in Japan
Yayoi, Ōita, a town in Japan
Yayoi, Tokyo, an area of Tokyo
Japanese destroyer Yayoi, two destroyers
Yayoi Sho, a Japanese horse race